Astrothelium is a genus of corticolous (bark-dwelling) lichens in the family Trypetheliaceae. The genus was circumscribed in 1824 by German botanist Franz Gerhard Eschweiler, with Astrothelium conicum assigned as the type species.

Species
, Species Fungorum accepts 241 species in Astrothelium.
Astrothelium aenascens 
Astrothelium aeneoides  – Brazil
Astrothelium aeneum 
Astrothelium alboverrucoides 
Astrothelium alboverrucum 
Astrothelium amazonum 
Astrothelium ambiguum 
Astrothelium amylosporum  – Bolivia
Astrothelium andamanicum 
Astrothelium annulare 
Astrothelium astrolucidum  – Brazil
Astrothelium aurantiacocinereum 
Astrothelium aurantiacum 
Astrothelium auratum 
Astrothelium aureomaculatum 
Astrothelium basilicum 
Astrothelium bicolor 
Astrothelium bivelum  – Brazil
Astrothelium buckii 
Astrothelium bullatothallinum  – Venezuela
Astrothelium bullatum  – Bolivia
Astrothelium calosporum 
Astrothelium campylocartilagineum 
Astrothelium carassense 
Astrothelium carrascoense  – Bolivia
Astrothelium cartilagineum 
Astrothelium cayennense  – French Guiana
Astrothelium cecidiogenum 
Astrothelium ceratinum 
Astrothelium chapadense 
Astrothelium chrysoglyphum 
Astrothelium chrysostomum 
Astrothelium cinereorosellum 
Astrothelium cinereum 
Astrothelium clypeatum 
Astrothelium coccineum  – Mexico
Astrothelium colombiense 
Astrothelium condoricum 
Astrothelium confluens 
Astrothelium conicum 
Astrothelium conjugatum 
Astrothelium consimile 
Astrothelium corallinum 
Astrothelium corticatum 
Astrothelium crassum 
Astrothelium cryptolucens 
Astrothelium curvatum  – Brazil
Astrothelium curvisporum  – Brazil
Astrothelium decemseptatum  – Brazil
Astrothelium deforme 
Astrothelium defossum 
Astrothelium degenerans 
Astrothelium diaphanocorticatum  – Papua New Guinea
Astrothelium dicoloratum 
Astrothelium dimidioinspersum  – Brazil
Astrothelium disjunctum  – Brazil
Astrothelium dissimilum 
Astrothelium duplicatum  – Brazil
Astrothelium ecuadorense 
Astrothelium effusum 
Astrothelium elixii  – Bolivia
Astrothelium endochryseum 
Astrothelium eumultiseptatum  – Brazil
Astrothelium eustomurale  – Brazil
Astrothelium exostemmatis 
Astrothelium fallax 
Astrothelium feei 
Astrothelium ferrugineum 
Astrothelium fijiense 
Astrothelium flavocoronatum 
Astrothelium flavoduplex  – Brazil
Astrothelium flavomaculatum 
Astrothelium flavomegaspermum 
Astrothelium flavomeristosporum 
Astrothelium flavomurisporum  – Brazil
Astrothelium flavostiolatum 
Astrothelium flavostromatum  – Brazil
Astrothelium flavum  – Brazil
Astrothelium galbineum 
Astrothelium galligenum 
Astrothelium gigantosporum 
Astrothelium globosum  – Brazil
Astrothelium graphicum  – Brazil
Astrothelium grossoides 
Astrothelium guianense 
Astrothelium indicum 
Astrothelium infossum 
Astrothelium infuscatulum 
Astrothelium inspersaeneum 
Astrothelium inspersoconicum 
Astrothelium inspersogalbineum 
Astrothelium inspersotuberculosum  – Bolivia
Astrothelium intermedium 
Astrothelium introflavidum  – Brazil
Astrothelium irregulare 
Astrothelium isohypocrellinum 
Astrothelium keralense 
Astrothelium komposchii 
Astrothelium kunzei 
Astrothelium laevithallinum 
Astrothelium laurerosphaerioides 
Astrothelium leioplacum 
Astrothelium leucosessile 
Astrothelium lineatum 
Astrothelium longisporum  – Brazil
Astrothelium lucidomedullatum 
Astrothelium lucidostromum 
Astrothelium lucidothallinum 
Astrothelium lugescens 
Astrothelium luridum 
Astrothelium macrocarpum 
Astrothelium macroeustomum  – French Guiana
Astrothelium macrosporum 
Astrothelium macrostiolatum 
Astrothelium macrostomoides 
Astrothelium macrostomum  – Brazil

Astrothelium marcidum 
Astrothelium mediocrassum 
Astrothelium megacrypticum 
Astrothelium megaeneum  – Bolivia
Astrothelium megaleium 
Astrothelium megalophthalmum 
Astrothelium megalostomum 
Astrothelium megaspermum 
Astrothelium megatropicum 
Astrothelium megeustomum  – Brazil
Astrothelium megeustomurale  – Brazil
Astrothelium meghalayense 
Astrothelium megochroleucum 
Astrothelium meiophorum 
Astrothelium meristosporoides 
Astrothelium meristosporum 
Astrothelium mesoduplex  – Brazil
Astrothelium miniannulare 
Astrothelium minicecidiogenum  – Costa Rica
Astrothelium mordonialense 
Astrothelium neglectum 
Astrothelium neodiplocarpum  – Bolivia
Astrothelium neogalbineum 
Astrothelium neoinspersum 
Astrothelium neovariolosum 
Astrothelium nicaraguense 

Astrothelium nigratum 
Astrothelium nigrocacuminum  – Bolivia
Astrothelium nigrorufum 
Astrothelium nigrum  – Brazil
Astrothelium nitidiusculum 
Astrothelium nitidulum 
Astrothelium norisianum 
Astrothelium novemseptatum  – Brazil
Astrothelium obtectum 
Astrothelium ochroleucoides  – Brazil
Astrothelium octoseptatum  – Brazil
Astrothelium octosporoides 
Astrothelium octosporum 
Astrothelium oligocarpum 
Astrothelium olivaceofuscum 
Astrothelium palaeoexostemmatis  – Thailand
Astrothelium pallidoflavum  – Bolivia
Astrothelium papillosum 
Astrothelium papulosum 
Astrothelium peranceps 
Astrothelium perspersum 
Astrothelium phaeothelium 
Astrothelium philippinense 
Astrothelium phlyctaena 
Astrothelium pictum  – Brazil
Astrothelium porosum 
Astrothelium praetervisum 
Astrothelium pseudannulare 
Astrothelium pseudodissimulum 
Astrothelium pseudoferrugineum 
Astrothelium pseudomegalophthalmum 
Astrothelium pseudoplatystomum 
Astrothelium pseudovariatum 
Astrothelium puiggarii 
Astrothelium pulcherrimum 
Astrothelium pupula 
Astrothelium purpurascens 
Astrothelium pustulatum 
Astrothelium pyrenuliforme  – Bolivia
Astrothelium quasimamillanum  – Brazil
Astrothelium quatuorseptatum  – Brazil
Astrothelium rhinothallinum 
Astrothelium rimosum 
Astrothelium robustosporum  – Brazil
Astrothelium rogitamae 
Astrothelium rubrocrystallinum  – Brazil
Astrothelium rubrostiolatum  – Brazil
Astrothelium rufescens 
Astrothelium sanguinarium 
Astrothelium sanguineoxanthum 
Astrothelium santessonii 
Astrothelium saxicola 
Astrothelium scoria 
Astrothelium scoriothelium 
Astrothelium scorizum 
Astrothelium septemseptatum 
Astrothelium sexloculatum 
Astrothelium siamense 
Astrothelium sierraleonense 
Astrothelium sikkimense 
Astrothelium simplex  – Brazil
Astrothelium sinuosum  – Brazil
Astrothelium sipmanii 
Astrothelium solitarium  – Brazil
Astrothelium sordithecium 
Astrothelium spectabile 
Astrothelium sphaerioides 
Astrothelium stramineum 
Astrothelium straminicolor 
Astrothelium stromatofluorescens  – Brazil
Astrothelium studerae  – Brazil
Astrothelium subcatervarium 
Astrothelium subdiscretum 
Astrothelium subdisjunctum 
Astrothelium subdissocians 
Astrothelium subendochryseum 
Astrothelium subinterjectum 
Astrothelium subnitidiusculum 
Astrothelium subscoria  – Bolivia
Astrothelium sulphureum 
Astrothelium superbum 
Astrothelium supraclandestinum  – Brazil
Astrothelium tanianum  – Malaysia
Astrothelium tenue 
Astrothelium testudineum  – Brazil
Astrothelium tetrasporum  – Brazil
Astrothelium thelotremoides 
Astrothelium trematum 
Astrothelium trypethelioides 
Astrothelium trypethelizans 
Astrothelium tuberculosum 
Astrothelium ubianense 
Astrothelium ultralucens 
Astrothelium unisporum 
Astrothelium valsoides  – Brazil
Astrothelium variabile  – Bolivia
Astrothelium variatum 
Astrothelium vezdae 
Astrothelium vulcanum 
Astrothelium xanthosuperbum  – Brazil
Astrothelium zebrinum

References

 
Lichen genera
Dothideomycetes genera
Taxa described in 1824
Taxa named by Franz Gerhard Eschweiler